Kevin Dunn (born 1956) is an American actor.

Kevin Dunn may also refer to:

Kevin Dunn (bishop) (1950–2008), English bishop
Kevin Dunn (musician) (born 1951), American guitarist